This is a list of Polish football transfers for the 2022–23 winter transfer window. Only transfers featuring Ekstraklasa are listed.

Ekstraklasa

Note: Flags indicate national team as has been defined under FIFA eligibility rules. Players may hold more than one non-FIFA nationality.

Lech Poznań

In:

Out:

Raków Częstochowa

In:

Out:

Pogoń Szczecin

In:

Out:

Lechia Gdańsk

In:

Out:

Piast Gliwice

In:

Out:

Wisła Płock

In:

Out:

Radomiak Radom

In:

Out:

Górnik Zabrze

In:

Out:

Cracovia

In:

Out:

Legia Warsaw

In:

Out:

Warta Poznań

In:

Out:

Jagiellonia Białystok

In:

Out:

Zagłębie Lubin

In:

Out:

Stal Mielec

In:

Out:

Śląsk Wrocław

In:

Out:

Miedź Legnica

In:

Out:

Widzew Łódź

In:

Out:

Korona Kielce

In:

Out:

See also
 2022–23 Ekstraklasa

References

External links
 Official site of the PZPN
 Official site of the Ekstraklasa

Poland
Transfers
2022-23